Omani Leacock (born on 1 May 1998) is a Barbadian footballer who plays as a forward for Barbados Defence Force and the Barbadian national team.

International career
Leacock debuted on 28 August 2015 in a 2–2 draw against St. Vincent and the Grenadines.

On 5 September 2019, Leacock scored his first goal for Barbados against non-FIFA member Saint Martin in the CONCACAF Nations League in a 4–0 victory.

Career statistics

International goals
Scores and results list Barbados' goal tally first.

References

1998 births
Living people
Association football forwards
Barbadian footballers
Sportspeople from Bridgetown
Notre Dame SC players
Barbados Defence Force SC players
Barbados international footballers
Barbados youth international footballers